No 620 Squadron was a squadron of the Royal Air Force during World War II.  During its existence it served as a bomber squadron, airborne forces and a transport squadron.

History
No 620 Squadron was formed at RAF Chedburgh on 17 June 1943 as a heavy bomber squadron equipped with the Short Stirling.  It was a part of No.3 Group of RAF Bomber Command and carried out night bombing and minelaying missions until November 1943 when it was transferred to No 38 Group RAF. The squadron flew 61 operations while part of Bomber Command, losing 17 Stirlings in the process. The squadron moved to RAF Leicester East on 27 November 1943 in preparation for airborne forces operations. By March 1944 the squadron had been moved to RAF Fairford to prepare for D-Day and completed many practice missions in Gloucestershire area such a parachuting and glider towing.

On D-Day itself, the squadron took part in Operation Tonga and dropped paratroopers of the 6th Airborne Division near Caen.  After these events, the squadron was used to resupply Allied forces in France, mainly SOE and the French Resistance.
No 620 Squadron also took part in Operation Market Garden, where they towed gliders and dropped paratroopers belonging to the 1st Airborne Division.  They also flew operations to resupply the struggling ground forces in and around Arnhem.  After these operations the squadron flew some missions in support of the resistance in the Netherlands and in Norway.

Throughout Operation Varsity in March 1945 the squadron towed 30 gliders, carrying anti tank and artillery weapons to their destination near the Rhine.

After VE Day, the squadron helped to transport ex-POWs, troops and supplies around Europe.  The Stirlings which they had used throughout the war began to be replaced in May 1945 by Halifaxes, and the sphere of operations was changed from Western-Europe to Greece, Czechoslovakia, Egypt, Italy and Palestine.  In December 1945 the squadron was moved to Tunisia and shortly thereafter to Palestine and Egypt and the squadron began missions in the Middle East. By June 1946 it received also some Dakotas, but on 1 September 1946 the squadron was disbanded at RAF Aqir, Palestine by being renumbered to No. 113 Squadron RAF.

Aircraft operated

Squadron Stations

Commanding officers

See also
 No 38 Group RAF
 List of Royal Air Force aircraft squadrons

References

Notes

Bibliography

External links

 History of 620 Squadron @ raf38group.org
 No 620 Squadron RAF movement and equipment history
 History of No.'s 611–620 Squadrons at RAF Web
 620 Derwent Valley Air Cadet Squadron

Aircraft squadrons of the Royal Air Force in World War II
620 Squadron
Military units and formations established in 1943
Military units and formations disestablished in 1946